Ed Asner was an American actor who received various awards and nominations. With seven Primetime Emmy Awards, Asner has won the most performance awards of any male performer in the history of the Primetime Emmy Awards. As a voice actor, he received notices for his work on animated series and films, including a Daytime Emmy Award nomination. Asner also received several honorary awards, including a star on the Hollywood Walk of Fame and the Screen Actors Guild Life Achievement Award.

Asner experienced much success in television during the 1970s, garnering acclaim for his role as Lou Grant on The Mary Tyler Moore Show (1970–1977) and the eponymous spin-off series based on Grant (1977–1982). For his role as Lou Grant, Asner earned three Emmy awards for Outstanding Supporting Actor in a Comedy Series and two for Outstanding Lead Actor in a Drama Series, becoming the first actor to win an Emmy award in both comedy and drama genres for the same role. He earned further acclaim for his work in television miniseries Rich Man, Poor Man and Roots as well as five Golden Globe Awards for his television work.

Audie Awards
The Audie Awards are awards for achievement in spoken word, particularly audiobook narration and audiodrama performance, published in the United States of America. They are presented by the Audio Publishers Association (APA). Asner received one award and one nomination.

Behind the Voice Actors Awards
The Behind the Voice Actors Award is an annual accolade that recognizes excellence in voice acting. Asner won an award in 2011.

CableACE Awards
The CableACE Award, created by the National Cable Television Association, was an annual accolade that recognizes the best in cable television. Asner received two nominations.

Character and Morality in Entertainment Awards
The Character and Morality in Entertainment Awards (CAMIE) are annual accolades presented to uplifting films. Asner won the Director Camie award for his work on The Christmas Card (2006).

Daytime Emmy Awards
Created by the National Academy of Television Arts and Sciences (NATAS) and Academy of Television Arts and Sciences (ATAS) in 1974, the Daytime Emmy Award is an annual accolade that honors excellence in daytime television programming. Asner received a nomination for his voice over work in WordGirl.

Golden Globe Awards
The Golden Globe Award, presented by the Hollywood Foreign Press Association (HFPA), is an annual accolade awarded for outstanding artistic achievement in film and television. Out of eleven nominations, Asner won five awards; two for The Mary Tyler Moore Show, one for Rich Man, Poor Man, and two for Lou Grant.

Grammy Awards
The Grammy Awards are awards presented by the Recording Academy of the United States to recognize "outstanding" achievements in the music industry. They are regarded by many as the most prestigious, significant awards in the music industry worldwide. Asner received two nominations.

Online Film & Television Association
The Online Film & Television Association Award is an annual accolade that recognizes excellence in film and television.

Primetime Emmy Awards
The Primetime Emmy Award, presented by the Academy of Television Arts & Sciences (ATAS), is an annual accolade honoring outstanding achievement in primetime television programming. Asner received seventeen nominations, winning five Emmys for his role as Lou Grant and two others for his work on Rich Man, Poor Man and Roots.

TV Land Awards
The TV Land Award is an annual accolade created by Michael Levitt which honors the best programs now off the air.

Visual Effects Society Awards
The Visual Effects Society (VES) presents an annual accolade for outstanding achievement in visual effects in film and television. Asner's character Carl from the 2009 film Up won the award for Outstanding Animated Character in an Animated Feature Motion Picture.

Other awards

Film festivals

Honorary

Notes

References

External links
 Awards won by Ed Asner at IMDb

Asner, Ed